Catherine Webb (4 May 1859 – 29 July 1947) was an influential activist in the early cooperative movement.

Biography 
Webb was the daughter of Thomas Webb, the manager of the Battersea and Wandsworth Cooperative Society. Her father worked his way up from poverty through the cooperative movement and she was raised middle-class. This upbringing brought question to the class in which she identified as she referred to herself as “a working-woman.” 

Webb joined the Women's Co-operative Guild in 1883. In the 1890s, Her interest lay in women's waged labor and led her to become involved with the Women's Industrial Council (WIC). Webb was WIC's general secretary from 1895 to 1902. She was elected to the Southern Section of the Central Board of the Cooperative Union in 1895. She served as a trusted lieutenant to Margaret Llewelyn Davies during her tenure as general secretary of the Co-operative Women's Guild from 1889 to 1911. She also edited the Guild's “Notes” feature in the “Women’s Corner,” writing about women workers and their unions and organizations such as the Women's Industrial Council and Lady Dilke's Women's Trade Union League. She believed once women workers were unionized, wages would increase and that cooperators should collaborate with trade unionists to organize workers. She considered the guildsman to have a special role in this project because as shoppers, women could influence factory conditions and management by not buying sweatshop labor and influencing stores not to sell products made by sweatshops. The result would be that sweat shop owners would be put out of business. She agreed with J.T.W. Mitchell that “there is no power greater than that of a woman when rightly exercised.”

Webb was the author of The Woman with the Basket, one of the most comprehensive sources for the early history of the Co-operative Women's Guild.

Further reading 
Webb, Catherine. The Woman with the Basket (1927) Manchester: Co-operative Wholesale Soc. Print. Works

References

1859 births
1947 deaths
Co-operative Women's Guild
Feminism in the United Kingdom
British cooperative organizers